Acrodipsas brisbanensis, the bronze ant-blue or large ant-blue, is a butterfly of the family Lycaenidae. It is found in Australia.

The wingspan is about 20 mm.

The larvae feed on the larvae of the ant species Papyrius nitidus.

Subspecies
Acrodipsas brisbanensis brisbanensis (Cape York to New South Wales)
Acrodipsas brisbanensis cyrilus (Victoria)

External links
Australian Caterpillars

Acrodipsas
Butterflies of Australia
Butterflies described in 1884